Léonardo Barral Martins Santos  (born 29 December 1989), better known simply as Léo Martins, is a Brazilian-born, Portuguese beach soccer player who plays as a forward. He is a two-time winner of the FIFA Beach Soccer World Cup (2015 and 2019).

He has an identical twin brother, Bernardo, who is also a high-profile beach soccer player.

Biography
Léo and his twin brother, Bê Martins, were born in Brazil. Léo was born two minutes after his older sibling. Aged 18, they went to play association football in Spain. During this time, they began the application process for Portuguese citizenship. This was possible since their paternal great-grandfather was from the country. In 2009, citizenship was achieved. In 2011, their contracts ended and aged 21, they returned to Brazil to find a new club. To maintain their fitness, they began training on the beach. Struggling to find a new football club, they started to pursue beach soccer instead, joining Vasco da Gama and soon after, Flamengo. Léo's progress was slightly behind his brother's, who moved on to a Russian club before him.

After finishing as top scorer at the 2014 Euro Winners Cup, Léo, and brother Bê received an offer to join the Portugal squad at the end of 2014 after playing for clubs in Italy. Despite offers from the Brazilian national team, the brothers decided they wanted to represent Portugal instead, citing their belief that there would be less chance of a "follow-up" if they were to join Brazil, their admiration for the country, and for Portuguese legends Madjer and Alan. Léo debuted for Portugal on 9 July 2015 at the 2015 FIFA Beach Soccer World Cup, six months after his brother.

Léo scored his first goal for Portugal in his second appearance, against Senegal on 11 July. That year, both brothers moved to Braga with whom they would go on to win multiple domestic and European titles.

In 2019, he was the second highest scorer in Beach Soccer Worldwide competitions with 69 goals. Following Portugal's 2019 World Cup victory, along with the rest of the squad, Léo was made a Commander of the Order of Merit.

Statistics

County

Club

Honours
The following is a selection, not an exhaustive list, of the major international honours that Léo has achieved:

Country
FIFA Beach Soccer World Cup
Winner (2): 2015, 2019
Euro Beach Soccer League
Winner (3): 2015, 2019, 2020
European Games 
Gold medal (1): 2019
Mundialito
Winner (1): 2017
Intercontinental Cup
Runner-up (1): 2019
Mediterranean Beach Games
Runner-up: 2019

Club
Euro Winners Cup
Winner (3): 2017, 2018, 2019
Runner-up (3): 2014, 2020, 2021
Mundialito de Clubes
Winner (2): 2019, 2020
Runner-up (1): 2013

Individual
Euro Beach Soccer League (2):
Superfinal:
Best player: 2020
Regular season stages:
Best player: 2018(1)
Euro Winners Cup (1):
Top scorer: 2014

References

External links

Leonardo Barral Martins Santos, profile at Beach Soccer Worldwide
Léo Martins at playmakerstats.com (English version of zerozero.pt)
Leonardo Barral Martins, profile at Beach Soccer Russia (in Russian)

1989 births
Living people
Portuguese beach soccer players
European Games gold medalists for Portugal
European Games medalists in beach soccer
Beach soccer players at the 2019 European Games
Brazilian emigrants to Portugal
Commanders of the Order of Merit (Portugal)
Portuguese twins
Twin sportspeople